Los Coches Creek is a  tributary of the San Diego River in southern San Diego County, California.

It has its source 3 miles east of the community of Flynn Springs and El Cajon. It flows west through the former Rancho Cañada de los Coches area, then turns northwest to its confluence with the San Diego River.

See also

References

San Diego River
Rivers of San Diego County, California
Rivers of Southern California